Traumawien was an independent publishing house founded in 2010 and dissolved in 2016.

Traumawien displayed print books of conceptual writers and artists such as Audun Mortensen, Ubermorgen, Oswald Wiener and published, among others, Mimi Cabell and Jason Huff's experimental reworking of the classic American Psycho which was exhibited at the Galerie nationale du Jeu de Paume in 2012.

Traumawien completed their initial publication series with the e-book system 'Ghostwriters' on copyright and user exploitation and disseminated a 42.000 titles e-book torrent contaminated with advertising slogans in 2013.

From 2013 to 2015 the publishers event 'Artclub Rave Lecture' – a working synthesis of industrial techno and literary reading/lecture, dubbed by Deutschlandfunk as 'the most radical performance' at europes largest event for young literature Prosanova – became a Vienna club scene check-point. 

In 2014 Traumawien created an ongoing series of nonprofit products from Zazzle, an online merchandise print on demand service, customized with content appropriated from various social media.

Also in 2014 a manifesto in "Manifeste für eine Literatur der Zukunft" with Neue Rundschau/S. Fischer Verlag/Frankfurt was released.

Meme Products were presented at 21erHaus Vienna Summer 2016.

The publisher cites conceptual writer Vanessa Place as a crucial influence.

Traumawien was dissolved in 2016 "due to artistic differences".

Print Publications 2010-2014
 Aust Götz von "Facorismen zur Lebenserbärmlichkeit" Vienna, 2012
 Mez Breeze "Human Readable Messages" Vienna, 2011
 J.R. Carpenter "Generation(s)" Vienna, 2012
 Hautmann Philip "Yorick" Vienna, 2010
 Hinke Margit "Shocking Blue Demon Lover" Vienna, 2010
 Huff Jason, Cabell Mimi "American Psycho" New York, Vienna, 2012
 Kaiser Olivia "La Bas" Vienna, 2013
 Larosche Brian "I™", Vienna, 2011
 Moosgaard Peter "Turbogott" Vienna, 2010
 Mortensen Audun Surf's Up 2010 Vienna, 2010
 Nausner Ulrich "OCR (deconstruction)" Vienna, 2013
 Palacz Julian "End Tell" Vienna, 2010
 Russeger Georg "Replik" Vienna, 2012
 Seipenbusch Anna "Never Catch Bombs" 2014
 Ubermorgen.com "AAbA LOGFILE" Vienna, 2012
 Vlaschits Marianne, Kunkel Martin "Das sinnliche Telefon" Vienna, 2010
 Wiener Oswald "Die Verbesserung von Mitteleuropa, Roman" Vienna, 2013

References

Book publishing companies of Austria
Austrian companies established in 2010